HMS Greyhound was a member of the 1719 Establishment Group of 20-gun sixth rates. After commissioning she spent the first part of her career in North America and the West Indies. Later she was in Home Waters and finishing in the Mediterranean on trade protection duties. She was sold at Deptford in October 1742.

Greyhound was the ninth named vessel since it was used for a 45-gun ship launched at Deptford in 1545, rebuilt in 1558 and wrecked off the Rye in 1573.

Construction
She was ordered on 4 July 1719 from Deptford Dockyard to be built under the guidance of Richard Stacey, Master Shipwright of Deptford. She was launched on 13 February 1720. She was completed for sea on 25 February 1720 at a cost of £3,211.13.53/4d plus £265.6.113/4 for fitting.

Commissioned service
She was commissioned in 1720 under the command of Captain John Waldron, RN for service in the Baltic. She was fitted at Deptford for service at New York in March 1721. She was captured by the Spanish off Cuba on 19 April 1721 during which Captain Waldron and the surgeon were killed. The British recaptured her later that evening. Captain John Condett, RN took command in late April 1721 at New York. In July 1722 Captain Peter Solgard, RN took command. She returned home and was fitted at Deptford for service in Scotland in February 1725, however was fitted in May for service in Newfoundland. She was with Hosier's Fleet in the West Indies during 1726/27. December 1727 she was under Captain John Gascoigne, RN followed by Captain Edward Baker, RN in March 1728. She was ordered home in September to pay off. She was refitted at Deptford between February and April 1729 at a cost of £3,452.10.2d. In 1729 she recommissioned under Captain Sir Yelverton Peyton, RN for service at Virginia. She returned home for a middling repair at Deptford from August 1732 to January 1733 at a cost of £2,557.7.5d. Captain James Cornwall, RN recommissioned her in 1733 for service on the Barbary coast. On returning home she was fitted for channel service by Admiralty Order (AO) 27 March 1734. In March 1734 under Captain John Ambrose, RN she was on impressment service. She moved to Tagus in 1735 then on to the Mediterranean in 1736. In April 1740 she came under Captain Edward Peyton, RN then later that year when ordered home she was under command of Lieutenant Richard Watkins, RN for passage to Home Waters.

Disposition
HMS Greyhound was surveyed at Deptford on 27 November 1740. She was  ordered to be broken by Admiralty Order (AO) 12 February 1741 and breaking was completed in June 1741.

Notes

Citations

References
 Winfield 2007, British Warships in the Age of Sail (1714 – 1792), by Rif Winfield, published by Seaforth Publishing, England © 2007, EPUB , Chapter 6, Sixth Rates, Sixth Rates of 20 or 24 guns, Vessels acquired after 1 August 1714, 1719 Establishment Group, Greyhound
 Colledge, Ships of the Royal Navy, by J.J. Colledge, revised and updated by Lt Cdr Ben Warlow and Steve Bush, published by Seaforth Publishing, Barnsley, Great Britain, © 2020, EPUB , (EPUB), Section G (Greyhound)

 

Corvettes of the Royal Navy
Ships built in Deptford
Naval ships of the United Kingdom